La fórmula del doctor Funes is a 2015 Mexican comedy Sci-Fi film directed by José Buil about a boy making friend with a rejuvenated scientist who goes around using youth serum on others people as prank or retribution. It won the 2016 Best Family film award in the San Diego Latino Film Festival.

Plot 
It is an adaptation of a novel by Francisco Hinojosa which tell the story of Dr. Funes, who discovers a formula to achieve eternal youth, and upon testing it on himself becomes a 12-year-old before embarking on new adventures with his friend Martín Poyo.

References

External links 
 

2015 films
2010s Spanish-language films
Mexican science fiction comedy films
Films about rapid human age change
2010s science fiction comedy films